Gambaro is an Italian surname. Notable people with the surname include:

Derio Gambaro (born 1955), American politician
Enzo Gambaro (born 1966), Italian footballer and manager
Griselda Gambaro (born 1928), Argentine writer
Teresa Gambaro (born 1958), Australian politician

Italian-language surnames